Sergei Zjukin (born 19 January 1972 in Tallinn) is an Estonian chess player who won the Estonian Chess Championship. He received the FIDE title of International Master (IM) in 2000.

Biography
In 1989, Zjukin graduated from secondary school in Tallinn and in 2001 he graduated from Tallinn University of Technology with degree a Chemical and Materials Technology. Tallinn chess school alumnus. For four consecutive years (1987-90) Zjukin won the Estonian championships among schoolchildren. He won the Estonian Chess Championship in 1996 and finished third in 2000. 

He played for Estonia in the Chess Olympiads:
 In 1996, at reserve board in the 32nd Chess Olympiad in Yerevan (+2 −1 =5);
 In 2000, at second reserve board in the 34th Chess Olympiad in Istanbul (+3 −0 =6).

Since 2004, Zjukin has been working as a chess coach in Tallinn's Tinu Truusa chess club and the Lasnamäe Noorte chess club.

FIDE ratings

References

External links
 
 
 

1972 births
Living people
Estonian chess players
Soviet chess players
Chess International Masters
Chess Olympiad competitors
Estonian people of Russian descent
Sportspeople from Tallinn
Tallinn University of Technology alumni